Blera garretti is a species of hoverfly in the family Syrphidae.

Distribution
Canada, United States.

References

Eristalinae
Insects described in 1924
Diptera of North America
Hoverflies of North America
Taxa named by Charles Howard Curran